PFE may refer to:

 Pacific Fruit Express, a railroad refrigerator car leasing company
 Parathyroid hormone 1 receptor protein
 Partial fraction expansion
 Pelvic floor exercise, also known as Kegel exercise
 Perfluoroether, a family of perfluoro polymer
 Permanent Fatal Error (a French post-rock band by Ulan Bator founder member)
 Pfizer Inc., New York Stock Exchange symbol PFE
 PolyGram Filmed Entertainment
 Portable Forth Environment, an Open source implementation of the Forth programming language
 Potential future exposure, the maximum expected credit exposure over a specified period of time
 Programmer's File Editor
 Product Family Engineering
 proudly found elsewhere, the opposite predisposition of not invented here.